The 1986 Major League Baseball postseason was the playoff tournament of Major League Baseball for the 1986 season. The winners of each division advance to the postseason and face each other in a League Championship Series to determine the pennant winners that face each other in the World Series. 

In the American League, the Boston Red Sox returned to the postseason for the first time since 1975, and the California Angels were making their third postseason appearance in the last eight years. In the National League, the New York Mets made their first appearance since 1973, and the Houston Astros were making their third appearance in the last seven years.

The playoffs began on October 7, 1986, and concluded on October 27, 1986, with the Mets defeating the Red Sox in seven games in the 1986 World Series. It was the Mets' first title since 1969 and their second overall.

Playoff seeds
The following teams qualified for the postseason:

American League
 Boston Red Sox - 95–66, Clinched AL East
 California Angels - 92–70, Clinched AL West

National League
 New York Mets - 108–54, Clinched NL East
 Houston Astros - 96–66, Clinched NL West

Playoff bracket

American League Championship Series

Boston Red Sox vs. California Angels

This was the first postseason meeting between the Angels and Red Sox. The Red Sox overcame a 3-1 series deficit to win in seven games and return to the World Series for the first time since 1975. 

Mike Witt pitched a five-hit complete game as the Angels blew out the Red Sox in Game 1. The Red Sox then turned the tables on them in Game 2, as Bruce Hurst pitched a complete game in a blowout victory for the Red Sox. When the series shifted to Anaheim, the Angels took the series lead with a 5-3 victory in Game 3, and then won Game 4 in 11 innings to take a 3-1 series lead, thanks to a walk-off RBI single from Bobby Grich which scored Jerry Narron. The Red Sox would win Game 5 in 11 innings to send the series back to Boston. In Game 6, the Red Sox blew out the Angels to force a seventh game. Roger Clemens pitched seven solid innings as the Red Sox blew out the Angels again in Game 7 to secure the pennant.

This was the third straight loss for the Angels in the ALCS. The Angels and Red Sox would meet each other in the postseason again in 2004, 2007, 2008 and 2009, with the Red Sox winning the first three series, and the Angels winning the last one.

This was the last postseason appearance for the Angels until 2002, where they would finally break through and win the World Series. This was the last time the Red Sox won the AL pennant until 2004, where they defeated their archrival in the New York Yankees in seven games after trailing 3 games to none in the series.

National League Championship Series

Houston Astros vs. New York Mets

The Mets defeated the Astros in six games to return to the World Series for the first time since 1973.

Houston's Mike Scott out-dueled New York's Dwight Gooden as the Astros took Game 1, with Scott pitching a complete game shutout. Bob Ojeda out-dueled former 1969 Mets alum Nolan Ryan in a complete game performance in Game 2 as the Mets won 4-1 to even the series headed to Queens. Game 3 was an offensive duel which was won by the Mets, 6-5, as Lenny Dykstra hit a walk-off two-run home run in the bottom of the ninth. The Astros evened the series in Game 4 as Scott pitched another complete game despite being on three-days rest. Game 5 was an ugly and low-scoring 12-inning affair that was won by the Mets, 2-1, taking a 3-2 series lead headed back to Houston.

Game 6 was the most notable contest of the series, as it went sixteen innings, the most of any postseason game outside of the World Series until 2005. The Mets tied the game with three runs scored in the top of the ninth. The game remained scoreless until the top of the fourteenth, when Wally Backman hit a go-ahead RBI single off Aurelio López to give the Mets a one-run lead. In the bottom of the inning, the Mets were two outs away from securing the pennant, but Houston's Billy Hatcher hit a solo home run to tie the game. The game went scoreless through the fifteenth, then in the top of the sixteenth, Darryl Strawberry doubled to lead off against López, followed by Ray Knight's single that scored Strawberry to put the Mets in the lead for good. Jeff Calhoun then replaced López and threw two wild pitches, the second scoring Knight to put the Mets up two. Dykstra then singled in Backman, who had walked, to extend their lead to three. However, the game was not over yet. In the bottom of the sixteenth, the Astros rallied once again when with one out, Davey Lopes drew a pinch-hit walk, followed by Bill Doran's single. Hatcher then singled in Lopes to make it 7–5, after which Denny Walling hit into a fielder's choice for the second out. Davis followed with a single to centerfield that landed in front of a charging Dykstra, that brought home Doran to cut it to 7–6, moving Walling into scoring position. The tying run was in scoring position and the winning run was at first base, and would-be Game 7 starter Mike Scott was waiting in the wings. Jesse Orosco, opposite Kevin Bass, eventually found himself at a full count. A strike away from a pennant, and simultaneously a misplaced pitch away from loading the bases, Orosco struck out Bass to end the threat, the game and the series as the Mets won the pennant. According to Orosco, prior to the at-bat against Bass, Keith Hernandez ordered him to throw nothing but breaking balls to Bass, telling Orosco, "If you throw one fastball to this guy, I'm going to kick your ass."

The Astros would not return to the postseason again until 1997. This was the last time the Astros appeared in the NLCS until 2004, where they fell to the St. Louis Cardinals in seven games. They would win their first pennant in 2005, which came against the Cardinals. The Mets returned to the NLCS in 1988, but were upset by the Los Angeles Dodgers in seven games. They would win their next NL pennant in 2000 against the Cardinals in five games.

1986 World Series

Boston Red Sox (AL) vs. New York Mets (NL) 

†: postponed from October 26 due to rain

This was the third Boston-New York matchup in the World Series. Previously, the Red Sox had faced the Giants in 1912, and the Dodgers in 1916, winning both meetings. In what is widely considered to be one of the greatest World Series ever played, the Mets overcame a two games to none series deficit to defeat the Red Sox in seven games, winning their first title since 1969. 

Bruce Hurst pitched eight solid innings as the Red Sox shutout the Mets, 1-0, in Game 1. They then blew out the Mets in Game 2 to go up 2-0 in the series headed to Boston. The Red Sox looked poised to pull off an improbable upset as they returned to Fenway Park. However, the Mets blew out the Red Sox in Game 3 to get on the board for the first time this series. In Game 4, the Mets jumped out to a big lead early and maintained it, winning 6-2 to even the series. Hurst pitched a complete game for the Red Sox in Game 5 as they won 4-2, now one win away from their first title since 1918. Game 6 was the most notable contest of the series, as the Mets rallied from a two run-deficit in the bottom of the 10th inning, despite having two outs and no one on base. The Red Sox were twice one strike away from securing the championship, but failed to close out the inning as the Mets won off an error by Boston first baseman Bill Buckner to force a Game 7. In Game 7, the Red Sox again took an early 3-0 lead, however the Mets scored 3 runs each in the 6th and 7th innings to take the lead for good. The Red Sox managed to cut the Mets' lead to one in the top of the eighth, however the Mets would score two more runs of the bottom of the eighth, and closed out the game in the ninth to secure the title. This was the second straight World Series won by an expansion team.

Due to the Mets claiming the series in Game 7, the Game 6 collapse entered baseball lore as part of the Curse of the Bambino superstition used to explain the Red Sox's championship drought after the 1918 World Series. As of 2022, this is the last time that the Red Sox lost in the World Series.

The Mets would return to the postseason in 1988 in hopes of winning another title, but were upset by the Los Angeles Dodgers in seven games in the NLCS. Their next World Series appearance would be in 2000, where they lost to their cross-town rivals in the New York Yankees in five games.

The Red Sox would also return to the postseason again in 1988, but were swept by the Oakland Athletics in the ALCS. They would, however, finally break the Curse of the Bambino in the 2004 World Series, where they swept the St. Louis Cardinals to win their first title since 1918.

References

External links
 League Baseball Standings & Expanded Standings - 1986

 
Major League Baseball postseason